Amboavory is a town and commune in Madagascar. It belongs to the district of Amparafaravola, which is a part of Alaotra-Mangoro Region. It is situated on the northern banks of Lake Alaotra.  The population of the commune was 15,465 in 2018.

Primary and junior level secondary education are available in town. The majority 90% of the population of the commune are farmers.  The most important crop is rice, while other important products are sugarcane and cassava.  Industry and services provide both employment for 2% of the population. Additionally fishing employs 6% of the population.

Transport 
The district is linked to Moramanga by the Route nationale 44 (Moramanga - Ambatondrazaka - Imerimandroso - Amboavory (228 km)).

References

Populated places in Alaotra-Mangoro